Sean Rafferty MBE is a Belfast-born, Northern Irish broadcaster, now best known for his work on BBC Radio 3.

Early life
Rafferty was born in Belfast, Northern Ireland and spent his childhood in Newcastle, County Down.

He went on to study law at Queen's University, Belfast.

Career
Rafferty's original career was as an accountant. In 1969, he met the head of BBC Northern Ireland at a conference, and this meeting led to Rafferty joining the BBC as a researcher.

He went on to become a regular presenter on the BBC Northern Ireland news television programmes, Scene Around Six and Inside Ulster. In 1990, he fronted the first chat show on BBC Radio Ulster, entitled Rafferty.
From 1994, he joined the morning radio news programme, Good Morning Ulster, and the arts programme 29 Bedford Street, and the following year, he launched the  drivetime news and current affairs programme on Radio Ulster, Evening Extra. Rafferty also fronted a makeover show, Room for Improvement.

After years working mainly in news and current affairs, Rafferty decided to cross over into arts broadcasting, and in 1997, he moved to London to present the drivetime music magazine programme on BBC Radio 3, In Tune. Under Rafferty, the programme features a mix of live and recorded classical and jazz music, interviews with musicians, and arts news.

Honours and awards
In 2004, Rafferty was named Radio Broadcaster of the Year at the Broadcasting Press Guild Awards.

Rafferty was appointed Member of the Order of the British Empire (MBE) in the 2017 Birthday Honours for services to broadcasting.

References

External links

In Tune (BBC Radio 3)

BBC Radio 3 presenters
Living people
1940s births
Mass media people from Belfast
Members of the Order of the British Empire